Humble Independent School District is a school district located in Humble, Texas, United States. It serves the city of Humble, small portions of the city of Houston (including the community of Kingwood), and portions of unincorporated Harris County (including the communities of Atascocita and Fall Creek). A small section of the district extends into Montgomery County. For the 2018–2019 school year, the district enrolled 43,553 students.

Humble ISD currently has five high schools, one magnet high school, seven middle schools, and twenty-five elementary schools. The district's flagship high school, Humble High School, opened in 1918.  It later moved to a new building, Charles Bender High School in 1929, and eventually to its current location on Wilson Road, as Humble High School, in 1965.  In 1979, Humble ISD opened Kingwood High School in the northern part of the district. Quest High School, the district's magnet high school of choice, opened in 1995 in the Community Learning Center.

In recent years, Humble ISD has become one of the fastest growing school districts in Texas. Humble High School's population grew to over 3000 students, which led to the opening of Atascocita High School in 2006. AHS was designed with smaller learning communities, in which students take their core classes in one of eight houses located at the school. After the opening of AHS, Humble and Kingwood High Schools were renovated and installed with smaller learning communities. In 2007, the district opened Kingwood Park High School at the former Kingwood ninth grade campus. Continued growth in the southern part of the district led to Humble ISD building Summer Creek High School, which opened in 2009.

In 2010, the school district was rated "recognized" by the Texas Education Agency.

History

Circa 1996, prior to the City of Houston annexing Kingwood, 2,600 people lived in both the City of Houston and within Humble ISD.  it is one of the school districts in the state with the highest growth rates.

Schools

High schools

Notes

Middle schools
Atascocita
Creekwood 
Humble
Kingwood
Riverwood
Ross Sterling
Timberwood
West Lake
Woodcreek
Autumn Ridge

Elementary schools

Feeders of Atascocita MS
Maplebrook Elementary School (Atascocita)
Pine Forest Elementary School (Atascocita, unincorporated area)
Timbers Elementary School (Atascocita, unincorporated area)
Fall Creek, Lakeshore and Summerwood elementary schools fed into Atascocita MS before the opening of Woodcreek MS

Feeders of Creekwood MS
Bear Branch Elementary School (Houston)
Greentree Elementary School (Houston)
Hidden Hollow Elementary School (Houston)
Pine Forest Elementary School (Kings River sections 9-10 only)

Feeders of Humble MS
North Belt Elementary School (Humble, unincorporated area)
Park Lakes Elementary School (Atascocita, unincorporated area)
Whispering Pines Elementary School (Atascocita, unincorporated area)

Feeders of Kingwood MS
Bear Branch Elementary School (partial)
Elm Grove Elementary School (Houston)
Foster Elementary School (Houston)
Woodland Hills Elementary School (Houston)

Feeders of Riverwood Middle School
Deerwood Elementary School (Houston)
Shadow Forest Elementary School (Houston)
Willow Creek Elementary School (Houston)

Feeders of Ross Sterling MS
Humble Elementary School (Humble)
Jack M. Fields Sr. Elementary School (Humble)
Lakeland Elementary School (Humble)
River Pines Elementary School (Atascocita, unincorporated area)

Feeders of Timberwood MS
Atascocita Springs Elementary School (Humble, opening August 2010)
Eagle Springs Elementary School (Atascocita, opened in 2005)
Oak Forest Elementary School (Atascocita, unincorporated area)
Oaks Elementary School (Atascocita, unincorporated area)

Feeders of Woodcreek MS
Fall Creek Elementary School
Lakeshore Elementary School (Houston, opened August 2009)
Ridge Creek Elementary School
Summerwood Elementary School (Atascocita, unincorporated area)

Feeders Of West Lake MS

Feeders Of Autumn Ridge MS

Notes

References

External links

 

School districts in Harris County, Texas
School districts in Montgomery County, Texas
School districts in Houston
1919 establishments in Texas
School districts established in 1919